This is a historical list of British engineers.

List

 John Allen (born 1928), engineer and plasma physicist
 James Atkinson (1846–1914), inventor of the Atkinson cycle internal combustion engine
 George Frederick Armstrong (1842–1900), sanitation engineer and academic
 William Armstrong (1810–1900), inventor of the hydraulic accumulator and breech-loading, rifled artillery
 Hertha Ayrton (1854–1923), pioneered the science of electric arcs and ripples in sand and water.

 Charles Baird (1766–1843), managed a company which built steam-powered machinery in Saint Petersburg, including Russia's first steam boat
 Edward Barlow (1639–1719), inventor of the repeating clock
 John Bell (1747–1798), inventor of various military and nautical devices, including a gyn and a petard
 Edwin Beard Budding (1796–1846), inventor of the lawnmower
 Jenny Body, aerospace engineer and former president of the Royal Aeronautical Society
 Matthew Boulton (1728–1809), partner in the steam engineering manufacturing firm Boulton and Watt, and inventor of a steam-driven coin press
 James Brindley (1716–1772), pioneering engineer of canals and aqueducts
 Isambard Kingdom Brunel (1806–1859), noted, among other achievements, for constructing the Clifton Suspension Bridge and the Great Western Railway

 Henry Chilver (1926–2012), expanded Cranfield Institute of Technology by focusing on the practical application of knowledge

Victoria Drummond (1894–1978), marine engineer who served at sea as an engineering officer in the British Merchant Navy and received awards for bravery under enemy fire.
Gertrude Lilian Entwisle (1892–1961), electrical engineer known for her work on designing DC motors and exciters and one of the founding members of the Women's Engineering Society.
Nigel Gresley (1876–1941), chief engineer of the London and North Eastern Railway who invented the Gresley conjugated valve gear

Caroline Haslett (1895–1957), electrical engineer who oversaw important requirements for electrical installations in post-war Britain 
Oliver Heaviside (1850–1925), electrical engineer, mathematician, and physicist who developed the transmission line theory and vectorized Maxwell's equations, among many other things.
Christopher Hinton (1901–1983), chief engineer at ICI who worked on the first nuclear power plant, Calder Hall

Peggy Hodges (1921–2008), communications and systems engineer who worked on guided missile technology at GEC Marconi
Sue Ion (born 1955), expert advisor on the nuclear power industry

 Andrew Meikle (1719–1811), inventor of an innovative mechanical threshing machine

 Rachel Mary Parsons (1885–1956), engineer and advocate for women's employment rights, was the founding president of the Women's Engineering Society in Britain. 
 Lewis Paul (died 1759), inventor of spinning and weaving machines

Dorothée Pullinger (1894–1986), pioneering automobile engineer and businesswoman 
Margaret Dorothea Rowbotham (1883–1978), engineer in the automobile, munitions and electrical sectors, and champion of women's employment in professional engineering
Dorothy Rowntree, first woman graduate in engineering from the University of Glasgow and the first woman graduate in naval architecture in UK
Evelyn Roxburgh (1896–1973), first woman to gain a diploma in electrical engineering in Scotland.
Beatrice Shilling (1909–1990), inventor of the "Miss Shilling's orifice", a critical component that prevented engine stall in the Rolls-Royce Merlin engines of the Hawker Hurricane and Supermarine Spitfire fighters.
Dorothy Spicer (1908–1946), aviatrix and the first woman to gain an advanced qualification in aeronautical engineering

 Richard Trevithick (1771–1833), inventor of a high-powered steam engine

 Frank Whittle (1907–1996), credited with single-handedly inventing the turbojet engine.

References

Engineers